Herbert William Mullin (April 18, 1947 – August 18, 2022)  was an American serial killer who killed 13 people in California in the early 1970s. He confessed to the killings, which he claimed prevented earthquakes. In 1973, after a trial to determine whether he was insane or culpable, he was convicted of two murders in the first-degree and nine in the second-degree, and sentenced to life imprisonment. During his imprisonment, he was denied parole eight times.

In a terrible coincidence for the people of the greater Santa Cruz region, Mullin and Edmund Kemper overlapped in their 1972 to 1973 murder sprees, adding confusion to the police investigations and ending with both being arrested, within a few weeks of each other, after the deaths of 21 people.

Early life, education, and mental health issues
Herbert William Mullin was born on April 18, 1947, in Salinas, California. His father was reportedly stern but not abusive. Not long before Mullin's fifth birthday, the family had moved to San Francisco.

Mullin had numerous friends at school and was voted "Most Likely to Succeed" when he was 16 by his classmates at San Lorenzo Valley High School. He experienced difficulty in life at this time, largely due to paranoid schizophrenic disorder. Shortly after graduating from San Lorenzo Valley High School, one of Mullin's friends, Dean Richardson, was killed in a car accident the summer after graduation in June 1965, and Mullin was devastated. He built "shrines" to Dean in his room and became obsessed with reincarnation.

In 1969, Mullin was admitted to Mendocino State Hospital. Over the next few years, he entered various mental hospitals, but was discharged after spells as being no harm to himself or others. In total, he had been committed to five mental hospitals. By the time he was in his mid-twenties, he had a diagnosis of paranoid schizophrenia, accelerated by his usage of LSD and marijuana.

Murder spree

By 1972, Mullin was 25 and had moved back in with his parents in Felton, California, in the Santa Cruz Mountains. His birthday, April 18, was the anniversary of the 1906 San Francisco earthquake, which he thought was very significant.

Mullin believed that the Vietnam War had produced enough American deaths to forestall earthquakes as a blood sacrifice to nature, but that with the war winding down by late 1972 (from an American perspective) he would need to start killing people in order to have enough deaths to keep a calamitous earthquake away. It was for this reason, he later said, that his father, through telepathy, had ordered him to take some lives.

On October 13, 1972, Mullin beat 55-year-old vagrant Lawrence "Whitey" White's head with a baseball bat when the transient looked at the engine of his 1958 Chevy station wagon after Mullin had pretended to have car trouble and pulled over, opening the hood. White had offered to help fix his car in exchange for a ride. Mullin dragged White's body into the woods, where it was found the next day. He later claimed his victim looked like Jonah from the Bible, and sent him telepathic messages "Hey, man, pick me up and throw me over the boat. Kill me so that others will be saved."

Mullin killed his next victim after his father "directed" him to kill his second victim as a sacrifice and also to test the hypothesis that the environment was being rapidly polluted and an earthquake was nigh. The victim was a female hitchhiker named Mary Margaret Guilfoyle (aged 24), whom he picked up on a highway. Mullin stabbed her through the chest while driving. He cut her abdomen open in order to test his hypothesis of pollution, took her organs out, examined them, and draped them on nearby branches so he could see them better. Her skeletonized body was only found after several months.

On November 2, 1972, Mullin had doubts about the appropriateness of his father's instructions and went to see a Catholic priest in a confessional booth at St. Mary's Catholic Church in Los Gatos. He recounted that the priest, Father Henri Tomei (who had been a member of the French Resistance during World War II and a music director at the Archdiocese of Marseille), wanted to volunteer to be his next sacrifice. He opened the confessional box and hit, kicked, and stabbed Tomei, who lay bleeding to death in the confessional while a parishioner watched Mullin run away. The parishioner ran to get help, but the witness description of a tall and thin man did not help the investigation much.

Mullin attempted to join the United States Marine Corps around January 1973, looking for a way to conduct his mission legally, but refused to sign a copy of his criminal record, and the Marines withdrew their offer. By January 1973, he had stopped using drugs and blamed them for his problems.

In early January 1973, Mullin drove to a remote area of cabins where he thought a former teammate who had first given him marijuana to smoke might live. The woman who answered the door was called Kathy Francis. Francis said the man he wanted to see lived down the road. In Mullin's memory, she also insisted that she and her children (David Hughes, aged 9 and Daemon Francis, aged 4) would like to volunteer to be blood sacrifices. He killed them all with a pistol. Mullin then knocked on the door of his teammate's home. The teammate was unable to answer why he had ruined Mullin's life with an early toke of pot, so Mullin shot him. Dying, the man crawled to his bathroom in an attempt to tell his wife to lock the bathroom door, but Mullin broke down the door and fatally shot her too. The police thought that the deaths in both homes were drug-related and did not suspect they were in any way connected with the priest's death or the previous murders of hitchhikers.

About a month later, on February 10, 1973, Mullin was hiking in the state park in Santa Cruz where he encountered four teenage boys (Robert Spector, aged 18, Brian Scott Card, 19, David Oliker, 18, and Mark Dreibelbis, 15) camping illegally. He walked over to them, engaged them in a brief conversation and claimed to be a park ranger. He told them to leave because they were, according to Mullin, "polluting" the forest. However, they shooed him away and stayed in the tent. The next day, Mullin returned and shot all four of them in the head with his .22 caliber pistol, killing them. When he had finished, he took their .22 caliber rifle and 20 dollars.

The next killing happened before the bodies of his previous victims were found later that week. It occurred as Mullin was driving firewood in his station wagon. He noticed his victim, a 72-year-old retired prizefighter and fishmonger named Fred Abbie Perez, working in his garden in Santa Cruz. Mullin did a U-turn, came back down the street, stopped, put the rifle across the hood of his car, and shot him once in the heart. He committed this killing in full sight of the dead man's neighbor, who got Mullin's license plate. A few minutes after the description was broadcast on the police radio, a "docile" Mullin was ordered to pull over and was arrested by a patrolman. In his car was the .22 caliber pistol used to kill the people in the cabins. He did not attempt to use the recently fired .22 caliber rifle on the seat next to him.

The police failed to recognize a pattern at the time of Mullin's murders due to several factors: firstly, the murders did not appear to be connected by a similar weapon or modus operandi; secondly, the victims differed from each other in terms of age, race, and sex; and finally, Edmund Kemper, who would kill the last of his own eight victims just a few weeks later, was operating in approximately the same area at the same time.

Mullin had committed his murder spree over four months.

Trial and imprisonment 

The Santa Cruz County District Attorney's office charged Mullin with ten murders, and Mullin's trial opened on July 30, 1973. Mullin had admitted to all the crimes and therefore the trial focused on whether he was legally sane (which, under U.S law, means that he understood the nature and quality of his actions, and understood right from wrong). The fact that he had covered his tracks and shown premeditation in some of his crimes was highlighted by prosecutor Chris Cottle, while the defense (public defender Jim Jackson) argued that Mullin's delusions made him kill. On August 19, 1973, after fourteen hours of deliberation, Mullin was found guilty of first-degree murder in the killings of Jim Gianera and Kathy Francis  because they were deemed premeditated and eight counts of second degree murder in the other killings because they were considered "impulse" by the jury. Mullin was convicted of the ten murders at the age of 26.

The Santa Clara County District Attorney's office charged Mullin for the murder of Henri Tomei. On December 11, 1973, the day his trial was to begin, he pleaded guilty to second-degree murder after originally pleading not guilty by reason of insanity to first-degree murder. He was sentenced to life imprisonment in the Santa Cruz County trial and was denied parole eight times from 1980 on. He was incarcerated at Mule Creek State Prison, in Ione, California.

While in custody, Mullin said he committed his crimes only in an attempt to save the environment. He was diagnosed by Dr. David Marlowe from the University of California at Santa Cruz with schizophrenic reaction, paranoid type.

Mullin had interactions with Edmund Kemper, another serial killer active in the same area and at the same time as he was. The two shared adjoining cells at one point. Kemper disliked Mullin, saying he killed for no good reason. Kemper recalled “Well, [Mullin] had a habit of singing and bothering people when somebody tried to watch TV. So I threw water on him to shut him up. Then, when he was a good boy, I’d give him some peanuts. Herbie liked peanuts. That was effective because pretty soon he asked permission to sing. That’s called behavior modification treatment.”

Kemper would describe Mullin as having a "lot of pain inside, he had a lot of anguish inside, he had a lot of hate inside, and it was addressed to people he didn't even know because he didn't dare do anything to the people he knew." In that same interview, Kemper called Mullin "a kindred spirit there" due to their similar past of being institutionalized. Kemper said he told Mullin "Herbie, I know what happened. Don't give me that bullshit about earthquakes and don't give me that crap about God was telling you. I says you couldn't even be talking to me now if God talking to you because of the pressure I'm putting on you right now, these little shocking insights into what you did, God would start talking to you right now if you were that kind of ill. Because I grew up with people like that."

Death 

On August 18, 2022, Mullin died at age 75 from natural causes while housed at the California Health Care Facility.

Victims

In popular culture
 Andy E. Horne played Mullin (renamed "Herbert McCormack") in the 2008 direct-to-video horror film Kemper: The CoEd Killer.
 Mullin was the subject of an episode of the television documentary series Born to Kill?.
 Mullin was mentioned twice (and was portrayed by uncredited actor Marco Aiello in a flashback) on the police procedural crime drama Criminal Minds.
 Mullin was covered on the true crime comedy podcast The Last Podcast on the Left starting with episode 416.
 Mullin was alluded to in the Church of Misery song "Megalomania" from the album Master of Brutality.
 Mullin was covered on the 57th episode of the true crime comedy podcast My Favorite Murder.
 Mullin was covered (alongside Ed Kemper) in the first season (2021) of the Investigation Discovery podcast, Mind of a Monster.
 Mullin was featured in a comic book by Kirt Burdick titled Herbie’s Song (2022)

See also 
 List of serial killers in the United States
 List of serial killers by number of victims

References

Bibliography

External links 
 

1947 births
2022 deaths
American mass murderers
American murderers of children
American people convicted of murder
American serial killers
Male serial killers
People convicted of murder by California
People from Salinas, California
People from Santa Cruz, California
People with schizophrenia
Prisoners sentenced to life imprisonment by California
Serial killers who died in prison custody
Serial mass murderers